Tucson Fireballs were a soccer club that competed in the United Soccer Leagues
from 1997 to 2001. The club originally started as the Los Angeles Fireballs. They moved to Tucson, Arizona and became the Tucson Fireballs in 2000.

Year-by-year

Notable players
 Randy Soderman
 Rick Soderman

Defunct soccer clubs in Arizona
Sports in Tucson, Arizona
Defunct United Soccer League teams
Los Angeles Fireballs
2001 disestablishments in Arizona
Soccer clubs in Arizona
Association football clubs disestablished in 2001
Association football clubs established in 1997